Someone Like Me is a Canadian documentary film, directed by Steve J. Adams and Sean Horlor and released in 2021. The film centres on Drake, a gay man from Uganda who moves to Vancouver, British Columbia as a refugee, and the group of Canadians who have agreed to sponsor him through Rainbow Refugee; it documents his arrival in Vancouver and his adaptation to Canadian life, including friction among his sponsors when all he wants to do is celebrate his new freedom by partying, and the emergence of the COVID-19 pandemic as a complicating factor.

The film premiered at the 2021 Hot Docs Canadian International Documentary Festival, where it was named one of five winners of the Rogers Audience Award. It was subsequently screened at the DOXA Documentary Film Festival.

The film was a finalist for Best British Columbia Film at the Vancouver Film Critics Circle Awards 2021, and a nominee for the DGC Allan King Award for Best Documentary Film at the 2021 Directors Guild of Canada awards.

References

External links

2021 films
2021 documentary films
2021 LGBT-related films
Canadian documentary films
Canadian LGBT-related films
Documentary films about refugees
Documentary films about gay men
National Film Board of Canada documentaries
Films shot in Vancouver
2020s Canadian films